The 38 cm SK L/45 "Max",
also called Langer Max (literal translation "Long Max") was a German long-range, heavy siege and coast-defense gun used during World War I. Originally a naval gun, it was also adapted for land service when it became clear that some of the ships for which it was intended would be delayed and that it would be very useful on the Western Front.

The first guns saw service in fixed positions (for example at Verdun in February 1916), but the lengthy preparation time required for the concrete emplacements was a severe drawback and a railroad mount was designed to increase the gun's mobility. The latter variants participated in the 1918 German spring offensives and the Second Battle of the Marne.

One gun, Batterie Pommern, was captured in Koekelare (16 October 1918) by the Belgians at the end of the war and the seven surviving cannons were destroyed in 1921 and 1922.

Design 

They were originally designed as the main armament of the s, but were deployed in fixed (Anschiessgerüst) and semi-portable (Bettungsgerüst) concrete emplacements that took weeks to months to build. One obvious change made for land service was the placement of a large folding counterweight just forward of the trunnions to counteract the preponderance of weight towards the breech. This, although heavy, was simpler than adding equilibrators to perform the same function. It folded to lower the gun's height while travelling.

To meet the demands for more mobility and a faster emplacement time, Krupp designed a combination railroad and firing platform mounting (Eisenbahn und Bettungsgerüst - E. u. This mount allowed the gun to fire both from any suitable section of track and from a fixed emplacement. The E. u. B. mount used a combination of cradle and rolling recoil systems to absorb the recoil forces when firing from rails. It could traverse a total of 2° for fine aiming adjustments, coarser adjustments had to be made by moving the entire carriage. The gun had to be loaded at zero elevation and so had to be re-aimed for every shot. Nicknamed Max, the gun's (supporting) barrel and railway-transportable carriage was used in the famed Paris Gun. Some guns were also emplaced in the Pommern (Koekelare) and Deutschland coastal defense batteries on the Flanders coast protecting occupied Ostend.

The first fixed emplacements (Betonbettung) used concrete and required a month or more to build. The Germans began construction of some during the winter of 1917—18 in preparation for their planned Spring Offensive. From May 1918 they used a removable steel box (Bettung mit Eisenunterbau) in lieu of the concrete that shortened the construction time, although the exact amount is unknown. Miller quotes three weeks as the time necessary to build the steel version from captured German manuals. The emplacement consisted of a central rotating platform, the main approach track and two auxiliary tracks on each side for the gantry crane necessary to assemble the emplacement, and an outer circular track to handle the ammunition. The central platform had railroad track on one axis and the actual firing mount on the other. All that was necessary to emplace the E. u. B. mount was to center it on the platform, jack it up, remove the trucks, and rotate the platform 90° and lower the mount to be bolted to the platform.

Ammunition

When used as a rolling mount, an extension of the carriage was fitted over the rear trucks to allow the ammunition car behind the mount to place ammunition on the shot truck which was then manually run up to the breech for loading. In an emplacement this extension was removed and ammunition hoisted up through a hatch on the floor of the mount, between the shot truck rails, from an ammunition car on the outer track and then lowered onto the shot truck. An estimated twelve men were required to ram the shell. It used the German naval system of ammunition where the base charge was held in a metallic cartridge case and supplemented by another charge in a silk bag which was rammed first. The existence of a shell with  range must be regarded as unconfirmed, the longest engagement recorded for any of these guns was  during the bombardment of Dunkerque by Batterie Pommern in Flanders in 1917—8.

Combat history 
They were used as heavy siege guns on the Western Front, and the first salvo from two of these guns commenced the first great German artillery bombardment beginning the Battle of Verdun.

Only one gun was transferred to the Army where it equipped Saxon Battery (Sächsische Batterie) 1015. This unit fired 141 shots from Bézu-Saint-Germain beginning on 15 July 1918. The navy retained the rest of the guns and operated them in support of the army. Three "Max" guns participated in the 1918 German spring offensives and two bombarded the French during the Second Battle of the Marne. One gun was found abandoned in a railway station west of Brussels in November 1918 by the Belgian Army, but the seven others had been evacuated to Germany before the Armistice where they were to be emplaced on coast-defense duties. All seven were destroyed by the Military Inter-Allied Commission of Control during 1921–22. The Belgians sold their gun to the French in 1924 for experimental purposes. It was captured by the Germans after the French surrender in 1940, but does not appear to have been used by them.
One of these guns was captured by the Australian forces during the battle which began on 8 August 1918. This gun was later presented to the city of Amiens by General Sir John Monash. There was also a second, smaller, gun (a 28 cm SK L/40 "Bruno") captured which now is mounted on display outside the Australian War Memorial in Canberra, Australia.

Today
In October 2014 a new museum called Lange Max Museum dedicated to the "Long Max" in Koekelare opened. The main subject of the museum is the Pommern Battery, a German 38 cm SK L/45 gun. Besides the museum, one may still visit the remains of the artillery platform.

Image gallery

See also
 BL 15 inch /42 naval gun - British naval counterpart
 Cannone navale da 381/40 - Italian naval and land counterpart
 BL 14 inch Railway Gun - British land counterpart
 14"/50 caliber railway gun - US land counterpart

Notes

References

Sources 
 François, Guy. Eisenbahnartillerie: Histoire de l'artillerie lourd sur voie ferrée allemande des origines à 1945. Paris: Editions Histoire et Fortifications, 2006
 Jäger, Herbert. German Artillery of World War One. Ramsbury, Marlborough, Wiltshire: Crowood Press, 2001 
 Kosar, Franz. Eisenbahngeschütz der Welt. Stuttgart: Motorbook, 1999 
 Miller, H. W., Lt. Col. Railway Artillery: A Report on the Characteristics, Scope of Utility, Etc., of Railway Artillery, Volume I Washington: Government Print Office, 1921

External links 

 Nav weaps page
 38 cm Max at Les Canons de l'Apocalypse (in French)
 Lange Max Museum in Koekelare, Belgium

380 mm artillery
Naval guns of Germany
World War I railway artillery of Germany